John Stoke or Stokes (died after 1383) was an English politician.

Family
Stoke was married to a woman named Joan.

Career
Stoke was mayor of Bristol in 1364, 1366 and 1379. He was a Member of Parliament (MP) for Bristol in 1363, 1372, and 1381.

References

Year of birth missing
Year of death missing
English MPs 1363
English MPs 1372
English MPs 1381